Indian National Lok Dal (INLD) is a political party in India, in the state of Haryana. INLD was founded in October 1996 as Haryana Lok Dal (Rashtriya) by Choudhary Devi Lal, who served as Deputy Prime Minister of India in the V.P. Singh's Cabinet and Chief Minister of Haryana twice.
Former Leader of Opposition, Abhay Singh Chautala is Secretary General of INLD.

History 

Chaudhary Devi Lal founded the Bharatiya Lok Dal in 1974 after winning the election from Rori constituency to the Haryana Legislative Assembly, while the INLD was founded in the year 1987 after assembly election. The 1982 and 1987 elections were fought under the name Lok Dal (LKD). The party renamed into its current name in 1998. The party was a member of the National Democratic Alliance (NDA), and thus part of the Bharatiya Janata Party led government from 1998 to 2004 at the Federal level.

INLD has performed poorly in all the four consecutive general elections held since 1998. It lost consecutive assembly elections for Haryana in 2005, 2009 and 2013. It failed to win any seats in Lok Sabha in 2004 and 2009 general elections, despite being in alliance with Bharatiya Janata Party in 2009.

In the Lok Sabha elections 1999, the INLD had an electoral alliance with BJP in Haryana. Each party contested five of the ten seats in the state. All ten were elected.

In 2000,  Chautala was elected as the Chief Minister of Haryana for the fifth time. In the 2000 state assembly elections, INLD won 47 out of the 90 seats. Later, INLD broke its alliance with the BJP and left the NDA and the government.

In 2004, the party contested on 20 Lok Sabha seats in Haryana, Rajasthan, Uttar Pradesh and Chandigarh, but 14 of those lost their deposits. Its 10 candidates in Haryana secured 22.43 per cent votes, 5 candidates secured 0.52 per cent votes in Rajasthan, 4 candidates secured 0.02 per cent votes in Uttar Pradesh and its lone candidate UT secured 6.61 per cent votes in Chandigarh.

However, in the 2005 Haryana state assembly elections, INLD lost its majority, winning just 9 out of the 90 seats compared to the Congress party's 67 seats. In 2009, the INLD won 31 seats.

On 16 January 2013, Om Prakash Chautala and Ajay Chautala were sent jail after a New Delhi court sentenced them to ten years imprisonment under various provisions of the IPC and the Prevention of Corruption Act.

In the 16th Lok Sabha elections, the INLD won on two seats. Dushyant Chautala was elected for a Hisar Lok Sabha Seat and Charanjeet Singh Rori was elected for a Sirsa Lok Sabha Seat.

In Rohtak at Chhotu Ram Stadium, INLD made the Guinness World Records for having supporters apply for 10,450 eye donations in 8 hours.

In the 2014 Legislative Assembly election, the INLD won 19 seats and is the chief opposition party in the state. Abhay Singh Chautala has been elected as Leader of Opposition in the State of Haryana.

On 14 April 2015, Indian National Lok Dal, Janata Dal (United), Janata Dal (Secular), Rashtriya Janata Dal, Samajwadi Party, and Samajwadi Janata Party (Rashtriya) announced that they would merge into a new national Janata Parivar Alliance.

Jannayak Janta Party emerged from a split in the Indian National Lok Dal (INLD) which itself had been caused by infighting among the Chautala family. An INLD rally at Gohana in October 2018 had seen heckling of Abhay Chautala, a son of INLD leader Om Prakash Chautala for which Dushyant Chautala, a grandson, and his younger brother, Digvijay Chautala, were blamed.

The JJP was formally launched at a rally in Jind in December 2018 by Dushyant Chautala who held a seat in the Lok Sabha of the national Parliament of India, from when he was an INLD member.

For 2019 Haryana Legislative Assembly election, they forged alliance with Shiromani Akali Dal. Previously both parties fought elections together but their alliance fell in 2017 over the issue of the Sutlej Yamuna link canal.

Nafe Singh Rathee has been appointed State president of Haryana. Rakesh Sihag is the official INLD Spokesperson for Media.

INLD Students Organization (ISO) is the official student wing of INLD. Shri Arjun Chautala is the national Incharge and Adv Raman Dhaka is the Secretary General of ISO.

List of Chief Minister

See also
 Aaya Ram Gaya Ram
 Dynastic politics of Haryana

References

External links 
 official website of Indian National Lok Dal

External links
http://www.inld.org

 
Political parties in India
State political parties in Haryana
Janata Parivar
Political parties established in 1999
1999 establishments in Haryana